Gilbert Richmond (2 April 1909 – 14 March 1968) was an English professional footballer who played as a full back. He played in the Football League with Nelson and Burnley.

Richmond was manager of Swedish club IS Halmia from 1947 to 1948 and from 1962 to 1963.

References

1909 births
1968 deaths
Footballers from Bolton
English footballers
Association football fullbacks
Nelson F.C. players
Clitheroe F.C. players
Burnley F.C. players
English Football League players
English football managers
English expatriate football managers
Heracles Almelo managers
USV Elinkwijk managers
Go Ahead Eagles managers
IS Halmia managers
English expatriate sportspeople in the Netherlands
English expatriate sportspeople in Sweden
Expatriate football managers in the Netherlands
Expatriate football managers in Sweden